Noah Locke (born May 10, 1999) is an American college basketball player for the Providence Friars of the Big East Conference. He previously played for the Florida Gators and the Louisville Cardinals.

Early life and high school career
Locke began playing basketball at the age of seven. He attended the McDonogh School, where he was coached by T. J. Jordan. As a senior, Locke averaged 21.6 points, seven rebounds and five assists per game. Locke garnered USA Today First Team All-USA Maryland Boys Basketball honors. He finished his career as the all-time leading scorer at the McDonogh School with 2,350 points. Locke committed to playing college basketball for Florida over offers from Michigan, Ohio State, Providence and Xavier.

College career
On January 11, 2019, Locke scored a career-high 27 points against Texas A&M. He averaged 9.4 points per game as a freshman. As a sophomore, Locke averaged 10.6 points and 2.5 rebounds per game, and his 48.1 percent three-point shooting in Southeastern Conference play led the league. He was hampered by a nagging hip injury, and underwent surgery in the offseason. In the 2021 NCAA Tournament, he scored 17 points in a loss to Oral Roberts. As a junior, Locke averaged 10.6 points and 2.4 rebounds per game, and he led the team with made three-pointers with 57. After the season, he transferred to Louisville. Locke averaged 9.6 points, 2.3 rebounds, and one assist per game for the Cardinals. He opted to use his additional season of eligibility and transfer to Providence.

Career statistics

College

|-
| style="text-align:left;"| 2018–19
| style="text-align:left;"| Florida
| 36 || 26 || 25.4 || .375 || .379 || .775 || 2.3 || .6 || .4 || .0 || 9.4
|-
| style="text-align:left;"| 2019–20
| style="text-align:left;"| Florida
| 31 || 29 || 29.8 || .429 || .432 || .714 || 2.5 || .7 || .6 || .0 || 10.6
|-
| style="text-align:left;"| 2020–21
| style="text-align:left;"| Florida
| 25 || 24 || 29.0 || .425 || .404 || .778 || 2.4 || .7 || .6 || .2 || 10.6
|-
| style="text-align:left;"| 2021–22
| style="text-align:left;"| Louisville
| 32 || 25 || 26.1 || .358 || .342 || .714 || 2.3 || 1.0 || .4 || .1 || 9.6
|- class="sortbottom"
| style="text-align:center;" colspan="2"| Career
| 124 || 104 || 27.4 || .394 || .387 || .748 || 2.4 || .7 || .5 || .1 || 10.0

Personal life
Locke is the son of Vanessa and Kyle Locke, both of whom played college basketball at Coppin State. His brother Kayel played basketball at UNC Greensboro before embarking on a professional career. His sister Paris plays for the McDonogh School team.

References

External links
Providence Friars bio
Louisville Cardinals bio
Florida Gators bio

1999 births
Living people
American men's basketball players
Basketball players from Baltimore
Florida Gators men's basketball players
Louisville Cardinals men's basketball players
Providence Friars men's basketball players
Shooting guards